NXTV may refer to:

Ningxia Television, a Chinese TV station
NextRadioTV, a French Radio and TV station